Schaghticoke may refer to:
 Schaghticoke (town), New York
 Schaghticoke (village), New York
 Schaghticoke people